Mehdi Bensib (born 1 September 1994) is a Tunisian footballer who plays as a defender for Al-Diriyah.

References

External links
 

1994 births
Living people
Tunisian footballers
Tunisian expatriate footballers
Étoile Sportive du Sahel players
AS Djerba players
AS Kasserine players
CS M'saken players
CA Bizertin players
ES Métlaoui players
Al-Orobah FC players
Al-Taraji Club players
Al-Diriyah Club players
Tunisian Ligue Professionnelle 1 players
Saudi Second Division players
Expatriate footballers in Saudi Arabia
Tunisian expatriate sportspeople in Saudi Arabia
Association football defenders